Verona Rupes is a cliff on Miranda, a moon of Uranus. It was discovered by the Voyager 2 space probe in January 1986.

It may have been created by a major impact, which caused the moon to disrupt and reassemble, or by the crust rifting.

Given Miranda's low gravity, it would take about 12 minutes to fall from the top, reaching the bottom at the speed of about 200 km/h.

References 

Extraterrestrial cliffs
Miranda (moon)
Surface features of Uranian moons